Sir Arthur Ford Hetherington (12 July 1911 – 16 February 2002) was the first Chairman of British Gas Corporation.

Hetherington was born in Highgate, London, the son of Sir Roger Gaskell Hetherington, and went to Highgate School.  He studied Natural Sciences at Trinity College, Cambridge and married Margaret Lacey on 19 July 1937. They had two children.

During the Second World War he served in the Fleet Air Arm and was awarded the DSC. After the war, he joined the gas industry, rising to Chairman of the Southern Gas Board.  With the advent of North Sea gas, he moved to the East Midlands Gas Board to manage the introduction of natural gas to British industry and domestic consumers.

Along with Sir Denis Rooke and Sir Henry Jones of the Gas Council, he was then responsible for combining the Gas Council and 12 separate gas boards into the British Gas Corporation in 1973.

Knighthood
He was knighted in 1974 and was one of the founding Fellows of the Royal Academy of Engineering. He was also Chairman of the British Standards Institute.

Family
On 19 July 1937, he married Margaret, the only daughter of Stephen Lacey and his wife Edith Hannay. The Laceys had been in the gas industry for two generations. They had one son and one daughter.

Death
He died 16 February 2002 at his home in Connaught Square, Westminster, London.

References

1911 births
2002 deaths
British chief executives in the energy industry
People educated at Highgate School
Alumni of Trinity College, Cambridge
Fellows of the Royal Academy of Engineering
Knights Bachelor
Businesspeople awarded knighthoods
Businesspeople from London
Fleet Air Arm personnel of World War II
Recipients of the Distinguished Service Cross (United Kingdom)
20th-century English businesspeople